Andre Smith (July 24, 1958 – March 4, 2023) was an American college basketball player for the Nebraska Cornhuskers in the late 1970s and early 1980s.

A native of Chicago, Illinois, Smith played at the University of Nebraska–Lincoln as an undersized center at 6'7". Between 1977–78 and 1980–81, Smith scored 1,717 points in 114 games for a career average of 15.1 points per game. At the time of his graduation, he was second on the all-time Cornhuskers scoring list. Smith is still found in the top 10 on many other school records. During his junior and senior years he was named a First Team All-Big 8 Conference member, and at the conclusion of his final season was named the Big 8 Conference Men's Basketball Player of the Year. In 1980–81, Smith averaged 18.3 points per game to lead the conference en route to becoming Nebraska's first-ever player of the year recipient. He earned honorable mention from the Associated Press in its voting for All-Americans. The Cleveland Cavaliers selected Smith in the 1981 NBA Draft, although he never played in the league.

Smith died in March 2023, at the age of 64.

References

Sources

1958 births
2023 deaths
American men's basketball players
Basketball players from Chicago
Centers (basketball)
Cleveland Cavaliers draft picks
Nebraska Cornhuskers men's basketball players
Power forwards (basketball)